An eponymous disease is a disease, disorder, condition, or syndrome named after a person, usually the physician or other health care professional who first identified the disease; less commonly, a patient who had the disease; rarely, a fictional character who exhibited signs of the disease; and, in some few instances, after an actor or the subject of a literary allusion, because characteristics associated with them were suggestive of symptoms observed in a particular disorder.

Naming systems
Eponyms are a longstanding tradition in Western science and medicine. Being awarded an eponym is regarded as an honor: "Eponymity, not anonymity, is the standard." The scientific and medical communities regard it as bad form to attempt to eponymise oneself.

Ideally, to discuss something, it should have a name. When medicine lacked diagnostic tools to investigate and definitively pinpoint the underlying causes of many diseases, assigning an eponym afforded physicians a concise label for a symptom cluster versus cataloguing the multiple systemic features that characterized the patient.

Some diseases are named for the person, most often a physician, but occasionally another health care professional, who first described the condition—typically by publishing an article in a respected medical journal. Less frequently, an eponymous disease is named after a patient, examples being Lou Gehrig disease, Hartnup disease, and Mortimer disease. In one instance, Machado–Joseph disease, the eponym is derived from the surnames of two families in which the condition was initially described. Examples also exist of eponyms named for fictional persons who displayed characteristics attributed to the syndrome; these include Miss Havisham syndrome, named for a Dickens character, and  Plyushkin syndrome, named for a Gogol character (the two also happen to be alternative names for the same symptom complex). At least two eponymous disorders follow none of the foregoing conventions: Fregoli delusion draws its name from an actor whose character shifts mimicked the type of delusion it now describes; Munchausen syndrome derives from a literary allusion to Baron von Munchausen, whose personal habits were suggestive of the symptom cluster associated with it.

Disease naming structures which reference place names (such as Bornholm disease, Lyme disease, and Ebola virus disease) are properly termed toponymic, although an NLM/NIH online publication described them as eponymic. Diseases named for animals with which they are associated, usually as a vector, are properly styled as zoonymic; cat scratch fever and monkeypox are examples.  Those named for association with a particular occupation or trade, examples of which include nun's knee, tennis elbow, and mad hatter's disease, are properly described as occupational diseases.

In May 2015, the World Health Organization, in collaboration with the World Organization for Animal Health (OIE) and the Food and Agriculture Organization of the United Nations (FAO), released a statement on the Best Practices for the Naming of New Human Infectious Diseases "with the aim to minimize unnecessary negative impact of disease names on trade, travel, tourism or animal welfare, and avoid causing offence to any cultural, social, national, regional, professional or ethnic groups." These guidelines emerged in response to backlash against people and places, based on the vernacular names of infectious diseases such as Middle East respiratory syndrome, and the 2009 swine flu pandemic. These naming conventions are not intended to replace the International Classification of Diseases, but rather, are guidelines for scientists, national authorities, the national and international media and other stakeholders who may be the first to discuss a disease publicly.

Punctuation
In 1975, the Canadian National Institutes of Health held a conference that discussed the naming of diseases and conditions. This was reported in The Lancet where the conclusion was summarized as: "The possessive use of an eponym should be discontinued, since the author neither had nor owned the disorder." Medical journals, dictionaries and style guides remain divided on this issue. European journals tend towards continued use of the possessive, while US journals are largely discontinuing its use. The trend in possessive usage varies between countries, journals, and diseases.

The problem is, in fact, that the possessive case was given its misleading name for historical reasons and that now even educated people, if they are not linguists, often make incorrect assumptions and decisions based on this misleading name. Nevertheless, no native speakers would accept the ungrammatical "men department" as a possible way of saying "men's department" nor claim that this "possessive" and obligatory apostrophe in any way imply that men possess the department.

This case was called the genitive until the 18th century and (like the genitive case in other languages) in fact expresses much more than possession. For example, in the expressions "the school's headmaster", "the men's department", and "tomorrow's weather", the school does not own/possess the headmaster, men don't own/possess the department, and tomorrow does not/will not own the weather. Most disagreements about the use of possessive forms of nouns and of the apostrophe are due to the erroneous opinion that a term should not use an apostrophe if it does not express possession.

In the words of Merriam-Webster's Dictionary of English Usage:

This dictionary also cites a study that found that only 40% of the possessive forms were used to indicate actual possession.

Autoeponym  
Associating an individual's name with a disease merely based on describing it confers only an eponymic; the individual must have been either affected by the disease or have died from it for the name to be termed autoeponymic. Thus, an 'autoeponym' is a medical condition named in honor of: a physician or other health care professional who was affected by or died as a result of the disease which he had described or identified; or, a patient, who was not a health care professional, but suffered from or died as a result of the disease. Autoeponyms may use either the possessive or non-possessive form, with the preference to use the non-possessive form for a disease named for a physician or health care professional who first described it and the possessive form in cases of a disease named for a patient (commonly, but not always, the first patient) in whom the particular disease was identified. Autoeponyms listed in this entry conform to those conventions with regard to the possessive and non-possessive forms.

Examples of autoeponyms include:
 Rickettsiosis: in 1906, Howard Taylor Ricketts discovered that the bacteria that causes Rocky Mountain Spotted Fever is carried by a tick. He injected himself with the pathogen. Ricketts died in 1909 while investigating typhus (Rickettsia prowazakii) in Mexico City.
 Thomsen's disease: an autosomal dominant myotonia of voluntary muscles described by Julius Thomsen about himself and his family members.
 Carrion disease: Peruvian medical student Daniel Alcides Carrión inoculated himself with Bartonella bacilliformis in 1885 to prove the link to this disease, characterized by "Oroya fever." He is now regarded as a national hero.
 Lou Gehrig's disease: although Gehrig, a New York Yankees player of the early twentieth century, was not the first patient described as having amyotrophic lateral sclerosis, the association of such a prominent individual with the then little-known disease resulted in his name becoming eponymous with it.

Eponyms and trends
The current trend is away from the use of eponymous disease names and towards a medical name that describes either the cause or primary signs. Reasons for this include:

 A national or ethnic bias attaches to the eponym chosen;
 Credit should have gone to a different person;
 An eponym may be applied to different diseases, which creates confusion;
 Several eponyms refer to one disease (e.g., amyloid degeneration is variously called Abercrombie disease, Abercrombie syndrome, and Virchow syndrome);
 An eponym proves invalid (e.g., Laurence–Moon–Bardet–Biedl syndrome, in which findings in the patients of Laurence and Moon were later found to differ from those of Bardet and Biedl).
 An eponym honors an individual who has been otherwise discredited (e.g., Wegener's Granulomatosis is named for Friedrich Wegener, a Nazi physician). It was renamed to granulomatosis with polyangiitis when Dr. Wegener's Nazi ties were discovered. 
 Its referent varies by country (e.g., sideropenic dysphagia is Plummer–Vinson syndrome in the US and Australia, Patterson–Kelly syndrome in the UK, and Waldenstrom–Kjellberg syndrome in Scandinavia).

Arguments for maintaining eponyms include:
 The eponym may be shorter and more memorable than the medical name (the latter requiring abbreviation to its acronym);
 The medical name proves to be incorrect;
 The syndrome may have more than one cause, yet it remains useful to consider it as a whole.
 It continues to respect a person who may otherwise be forgotten.

The usage of the genitive apostrophe in disease eponyms has followed different trends. While it remains common for some diseases, it has dwindled for others.

Alphabetical list

Explanation of listing sequence
As described above, multiple eponyms can exist for the same disease. In these instances, each is listed individually (except as described below), followed by an in-line parenthetical entry beginning 'aka' ('also known as') that lists all alternative eponyms. This facilitates use of the list for a reader who knows a particular disease only by one of its eponyms, without the necessity of cross-linking entries.

It sometimes happens that an alternative eponym, if listed separately, would immediately alphabetically precede or succeed another eponymous entry for the same disease. There are three conventions that have been applied to these instances:

1. No separate entry appears for the alternative eponym. It is listed only in the parenthetical 'aka' entry (e.g., Aarskog syndrome appears only as a parenthetical entry to Aarskog–Scott syndrome). 
2. If eponymous names subsequent to the first are sequenced differently or the eponym is differentiated by another term (e.g., disease versus syndrome), alphabetical sequence dictates which is the linked version versus which is listed as the alternative (e.g., Abderhalden–Kaufmann–Lignac is the linked entry and Abderhalden–Lignac–Kaufmann is the parenthetical alternative entry).
3. If the number of names included in two or more eponyms varies, the linked entry is the one which includes the most individual surnames (e.g., Alpers–Huttenlocher syndrome is the linked entry for the disease also known as Alpers disease or Alpers syndrome).

A
 Aarskog–Scott syndrome (a.k.a. Aarskog syndrome) – Dagfinn Aarskog, Charles I. Scott Jr. 
 Aase–Smith syndrome (a.k.a. Aase syndrome) – Jon Morton Aase, David Weyhe Smith
 Abdallat–Davis–Farrage syndrome – Adnan Al Abdallat, S.M. Davis, James Robert Farrage
 Abderhalden–Kaufmann–Lignac syndrome (a.k.a. Abderhalden–Lignac–Kaufmann disease) – Emil Abderhalden, Eduard Kauffman, George Lignac
 Abercrombie disease (a.k.a. Abercrombie syndrome) – John Abercrombie
 Achard–Thiers syndrome – Emile Achard, Joseph Thiers
 Ackerman tumor – Lauren Ackerman
 Adams–Oliver syndrome – Robert Adams, William Oliver
 Adams–Stokes syndrome (a.k.a. Gerbec–Morgagni–Adams–Stokes syndrome, Gerbezius–Morgagni–Adams–Stokes syndrome, Stokes–Adams syndrome) – Robert Adams, William Stokes
 Addison disease – Thomas Addison
 Adson–Caffey syndrome – Alfred Washington Adson, I. R. Caffey
 Ahumada–Del Castillo syndrome – Juan Carlos Ahumada Sotomayor, Enrique Benjamin Del Castillo
 Aicardi syndrome – Jean Aicardi
 Aicardi–Goutières syndrome – Jean Aicardi, Francoise Goutieres
 Alagille syndrome – Daniel Alagille
 Albers-Schönberg disease – Heinrich Albers-Schönberg
 Albright disease (a.k.a. Albright hereditary osteodystrophy, Albright syndrome, McCune–Albight syndrome) – Fuller Albright
 Albright–Butler–Bloomberg disease – Fuller Albright, Allan Macy Butler, Esther Bloomberg
 Albright–Hadorn syndrome – Fuller Albright, Walter Hadorn
 Albright IV syndrome (a.k.a. Martin–Albright syndrome) – Fuller Albright
 Alexander disease – William Stuart Alexander
 Alibert–Bazin syndrome – Jean-Louis-Marc Alibert, Pierre-Antoine-Ernest Bazin
 Alice in Wonderland syndrome (a.k.a. Todd syndrome) – Alice, a fictional character in works of Lewis Carroll  
 Alpers–Huttenlocher syndrome (a.k.a. Alpers disease, Alpers syndrome) – Bernard Jacob Alpers, Peter Huttenlocher
 Alport syndrome – Arthur Cecil Alport
 Alström syndrome – Carl Henry Alström
 Alvarez syndrome – Walter C. Alvarez
 Alzheimer disease – Alois Alzheimer
 Anders disease – James Meschter Anders
 Andersen disease – Dorothy Hansine Andersen
 Andersen–Tawil syndrome (a.k.a. Andersen syndrome) – Ellen Andersen, Al-Rabi Tawil
 Anderson–Fabry disease – William Anderson, Johannes Fabry
 Angelman syndrome – Harry Angelman
 Angelucci syndrome – Arnaldo Angelucci
 Anton–Babinski syndrome (a.k.a. Anton syndrome) – Gabriel Anton, Joseph Babinski
 Apert syndrome – Eugène Apert
 Aran–Duchenne disease (a.k.a. Aran–Duchenne spinal muscular atrophy) – François-Amilcar Aran, Guillaume Duchenne
 Arnold–Chiari malformation – Julius Arnold, Hans Chiari
 Asherman syndrome – Joseph G. Asherman
 Asperger syndrome (a.k.a. Asperger disorder) – Hans Asperger
 Avellis syndrome – Georg Avellis
 Ayerza–Arrillaga syndrome (a.k.a. Ayerza–Arrillaga disease, Ayerza syndrome, Ayerza disease) – Abel Ayerza, Francisco Arrillaga

B
 Baastrup sign – Christian Ingerslev Baastrup
 Babesiosis – Victor Babeş
 Babington disease – Benjamin Babington
 Babinski–Fröhlich syndrome – Joseph Babinski, Alfred Fröhlich
 Babinski–Froment syndrome – Joseph Babinski, Jules Froment
 Babinski–Nageotte syndrome – Joseph Babinski, Jean Nageotte
 Baker cyst – William Morrant Baker
 Baller–Gerold syndrome – Friedrich Baller, M Gerold
 Balo concentric sclerosis (a.k.a. Balo disease) – József Mátyás Baló
 Bamberger disease – Heinrich von Bamberger
 Bamberger–Marie disease – Eugen von Bamberger, Pierre Marie
 Bamforth–Lazarus syndrome - J Steven Bamforth, John Lazarus
 Bancroft filariasis – Joseph Bancroft
 Bang disease – Bernhard Bang
 Bankart lesion – Arthur Sidney Blundell Bankart
 Bannayan–Riley–Ruvalcaba syndrome – George A. Bannayan, Harris D. Riley Jr., Rogelio H. A. Ruvalcaba 
 Bannayan–Zonana syndrome – George A. Bannayan, Jonathan X. Zonana
 Banti syndrome – Guido Banti
 Bárány syndrome – Robert Bárány
 Bardet–Biedl syndrome (formerly, a.k.a. Laurence–Moon–Bardet–Biedl syndrome, but that construct is now deemed invalid) – Georges Bardet, Arthur Biedl 
 Barlow disease – Thomas Barlow
 Barlow syndrome – John Barlow
 Barraquer–Simons syndrome – Luis Barraquer Roviralta, Arthur Simons
 Barré–Liéou syndrome – Jean Alexandre Barré, Yang-Choen Liéou
 Barrett ulcer – Norman Barrett
 Bart–Pumphrey syndrome – R. S. Bart, R. E. Pumphrey
 Barth syndrome – Peter Barth
 Bartholin cyst – Caspar Bartholin
 Bartter syndrome – Frederic Bartter
 Basedow coma – Karl Adolph von Basedow
 Basedow disease (a.k.a. Basedow syndrome, Begbie disease, Flajan disease, Flajani–Basedow syndrome, Graves disease, Graves–Basedow disease, Marsh disease, Morbus Basedow – Karl Adolph von Basedow
 Basedow ocular syndrome – Karl Adolph von Basedow
 Bassen–Kornzweig syndrome – Frank Bassen, Abraham Kornzweig
 Batten disease – Frederick Batten
 Bazin disease – Pierre-Antoine-Ernest Bazin
 Becker muscular dystrophy – Peter Emil Becker
 Beckwith–Wiedemann syndrome – John Bruce Beckwith, Hans-Rudolf Wiedemann
 Behçet disease – Hulusi Behçet
 Bekhterev disease – Vladimir Bekhterev
 Bell palsy – Charles Bell
 Benedikt syndrome – Moritz Benedikt
 Benjamin syndrome – Erich Benjamin
 Berardinelli–Seip congenital lipodystrophy – Waldemar Berardinelli, Martin Seip
 Berdon syndrome – Walter Berdon
 Berger disease – Jean Berger
 Bergeron disease – Etienne-Jules Bergeron
 Bernard syndrome – Claude Bernard
 Bernard–Soulier syndrome – Jean Bernard, Jean Pierre Soulier
 Bernhardt–Roth paraesthesia – Martin Bernhardt, Vladimir Karlovich Roth
 Bernheim syndrome – P. I. Bernheim
 Besnier prurigo – Ernest Henri Besnier
 Besnier–Boeck–Schaumann disease – Ernest Henri Besnier, Cæsar Peter Møller Boeck, Jörgen Nilsen Schaumann
 Biermer anaemia – Michael Anton Biermer
 Bietti crystalline dystrophy – G. Bietti
 Bickerstaff brainstem encephalitis – Edwin Bickerstaff
 Bilharzia – Theodor Maximilian Bilharz
 Binder syndrome – K.H. Binder
 Bing–Horton syndrome – Paul Robert Bing, Bayard Taylor Horton
 Bing–Neel syndrome – Jens Bing, Axel Valdemar Neel
 Binswanger dementia – Otto Binswanger
 Birt–Hogg–Dubé syndrome – Arthur Birt, Georgina Hogg, William Dubé
 Bland–White–Garland syndrome – Edward Franklin Bland, Paul Dudley White, Joseph Garland
 Bloch–Sulzberger syndrome – Bruno Bloch, Marion Baldur Sulzberger
 Bloom syndrome – David Bloom
 Blount syndrome – Walter Putnam Blount
 Boerhaave syndrome – Herman Boerhaave
 Bogorad syndrome – F. A. Bogorad
 Bonnevie–Ullrich syndrome – Kristine Bonnevie, Otto Ullrich
 Bourneville–Pringle disease – Désiré-Magloire Bourneville, John James Pringle
 Bowen disease – John T. Bowen
 Brachman de Lange syndrome – Winfried Robert Clemens Brachmann, Cornelia Catharina de Lange
 Brailsford–Morquio syndrome – James Frederick Brailsford, Luís Morquio
 Brandt syndrome – Thore Edvard Brandt
 Brenner tumour – Fritz Brenner
 Brewer kidney – George Emerson Brewer
 Bright disease – Richard Bright
 Brill–Symmers disease – Nathan Brill, Douglas Symmers
 Brill–Zinsser disease – Nathan Brill, Hans Zinsser
 Briquet syndrome – Paul Briquet
 Brissaud disease – Édouard Brissaud
 Brissaud–Sicard syndrome – Édouard Brissaud, Jean-Athanase Sicard
 Broadbent apoplexy – William Broadbent
 Brock syndrome – Russell Claude Brock
 Brodie abscess – Benjamin Collins Brodie
 Brodie syndrome – Benjamin Collins Brodie
 Brooke epithelioma – Henry Ambrose Grundy Brooke
 Brown-Séquard syndrome – Charles-Édouard Brown-Séquard
 Brucellosis – David Bruce
 Bruck–de Lange disease – Franz Bruck, Cornelia Catharina de Lange
 Brugada syndrome – Pedro Brugada, Josep Brugada
 Bruns syndrome – Ludwig Bruns
 Bruton–Gitlin syndrome – Ogden Carr Bruton, David Gitlin
 Budd–Chiari syndrome – George Budd, Hans Chiari
 Buerger disease – Leo Buerger
 Bumke syndrome – Oswald Conrad Edouard Bumke
 Bürger–Grütz syndrome – Max Burger, Otto Grutz
 Burkitt lymphoma – Denis Parsons Burkitt
 Burnett syndrome – Charles Hoyt Burnett
 Bywaters syndrome – Eric Bywaters

C
 Caffey–Silverman syndrome – John Patrick Caffey, William Silverman
 Calvé disease – Jacques Calvé
 Camurati–Engelmann disease (a.k.a. Camurati–Engelmann syndrome, Engelmann disease, Engelmann syndrome) – M. Camurati, G. Engelmann
 Canavan disease – Myrtelle Canavan
 Cannon disease – Abernathy Benson Cannon
 Cantú syndrome – José María Cantú
 Capgras delusion (a.k.a. Capgras syndrome) – Joseph Capgras
 Caplan syndrome – Anthony Caplan
 Carney complex – J. Aidan Carney
 Carney triad – J. Aidan Carney
 Carney–Stratakis syndrome – J. Aidan Carney, C. A. Stratakis
 Caroli syndrome – Jacques Caroli
 Carrion disease – Daniel Alcides Carrión
 Castleman disease – Benjamin Castleman
 Céstan–Chenais syndrome – Étienne Jacques Marie Raymond Céstan, Louis Jean Chennais
 Chagas disease – Carlos Chagas
 Charcot disease – Jean-Martin Charcot
 Charcot–Marie–Tooth disease – Jean-Martin Charcot, Pierre Marie, Howard Henry Tooth
 Charles Bonnet syndrome – Charles Bonnet
 Cheadle disease – Walter Butler Cheadle
 Chédiak–Higashi syndrome – Alexander Chédiak, Otokata Higashi
 Chiari malformation – Hans Chiari
 Chiari–Frommel syndrome – Johann Baptist Chiari, Richard Frommel
 Chilaiditi syndrome – Demetrius Chilaiditi
 Christ–Siemens–Touraine syndrome – Josef Christ, Hermann Werner Siemens, Albert Touraine
 Christensen–Krabbe disease – Erna Christensen, Knud Krabbe
 Christmas disease – Stephen Christmas
 Churg–Strauss syndrome – Jacob Churg, Lotte Strauss
 Claude syndrome – Henri Claude
 Claude Bernard–Horner syndrome – Claude Bernard, Johann Friedrich Horner
 Clerambault syndrome – Gaëtan Gatian de Clerambault
 Clerambault–Kandinsky syndrome – Gaëtan Gatian de Clerambault, Victor Khrisanfovich Kandinsky
 Coats disease – George Coats
 Cock peculiar tumor – Edward Cock
 Cockayne syndrome – Edward Alfred Cockayne
 Coffin–Lowry syndrome – Grange Coffin, Robert Lowry
 Coffin–Siris syndrome – Grange Coffin, Evelyn Siris
 Cogan syndrome – David Glendenning Cogan
 Cohen syndrome – Michael Cohen
 Collet–Sicard syndrome – Frédéric Justin Collet, Jean-Athanase Sicard
 Concato disease – Luigi Maria Concato
 Conn syndrome – Jerome Conn
 Cooley anemia – Thomas Benton Cooley
 Cori Disease – Carl Ferdinand Cori, Gerty Cori
 Cornelia de Lange syndrome – Cornelia Catharina de Lange
 Costello syndrome – Jack Costello
 Costen syndrome – James Bray Costen
 Cotard delusion (a.k.a. Cotard syndrome) – Jules Cotard
 Cowden syndrome (a.k.a. Cowden disease) – Rachel Cowden
 Crigler–Najjar syndrome – John Fielding Crigler, Victor Assad Najjar
 Creutzfeldt–Jakob disease – Hans Gerhard Creutzfeldt, Alfons Maria Jakob
 Crocq–Cassirer syndrome – Jean Crocq, Richard Cassirer
 Crohn disease – Burrill Bernard Crohn
 Cronkhite–Canada syndrome – L. W. Cronkhite, Wilma Canada
 Crouzon syndrome – Octave Crouzon
 Cruveilhier–Baumgarten disease – Jean Cruveilhier, Paul Clemens von Baumgarten
 Cruz disease – Osvaldo Gonçalves Cruz
 Cryer syndrome – Philip E. Cryer
 Curling ulcer – Thomas Blizard Curling
 Curschmann–Batten–Steinert syndrome – Hans Curschmann, Frederick Batten, Hans Gustav Steinert
 Cushing disease – Harvey Cushing
 Cushing ulcer – Harvey Cushing

D
 Da Costa syndrome – Jacob Mendez Da Costa
 Dalrymple disease – John Dalrymple
 Danbolt–Closs syndrome – Niels Christian Gauslaa Danbolt, Karl Philipp Closs
 Dandy–Walker syndrome – Walter Dandy, Arthur Earl Walker
 De Clérambault syndrome – Gaëtan Gatian de Clérambault
 de Quervain disease – Fritz de Quervain
 de Quervain thyroiditis – Fritz de Quervain
 Dejerine–Sottas disease – Joseph Jules Dejerine, Jules Sottas
 Dennie–Marfan syndrome – Charles Clayton Dennie, Antoine Marfan
 Dent disease – Charles Enrique Dent
 Denys–Drash syndrome – Pierre Denys, Allan L. Drash
 Dercum disease – Francis Xavier Dercum
 Devic disease (a.k.a. Devic syndrome) – Eugène Devic
 Diamond–Blackfan anemia – Louis Diamond, Kenneth Blackfan
 DiGeorge syndrome – Angelo DiGeorge
 Di Guglielmo disease – Giovanni di Gugliemo
 Diogenes syndrome (a.k.a. Havisham syndrome, Miss Havisham syndrome, Plyushkin syndrome)– Diogenes of Sinope (the particular usage, Diogenes syndrome, is deemed to be a misnomer)
 Doege–Potter syndrome – Karl W. Doege, Roy P. Potter
 Donnai–Barrow syndrome – Dian Donnai, Margaret Barrow
 Donovanosis – Charles Donovan
 Down syndrome – John Langdon Down
 Dravet syndrome – Charlotte Dravet
 Dressler syndrome – William Dressler
 Duane syndrome – Alexander Duane
 Dubin–Johnson syndrome
 Duchenne–Aran disease – Guillaume-Benjamin-Amand Duchenne de Boulogne, François-Amilcar Aran
 Duchenne muscular dystrophy – Guillaume-Benjamin-Amand Duchenne de Boulogne
 Dukes disease – Clement Dukes
 Duncan disease (a.k.a. Duncan syndrome, Purtilo syndrome) – David Theodore Purtilo
 Dupuytren contracture (a.k.a. Dupuytren disease) – Baron Guillaume Dupuytren
 Duroziez disease – Paul Louis Duroziez

E
 Eales disease – Henry Eales
 Early-onset Alzheimer disease – Alois Alzheimer
 Ebstein's anomaly – Wilhelm Ebstein
 Edwards syndrome – John H. Edwards
 Ehlers–Danlos syndrome – Edvard Ehlers, Henri-Alexandre Danlos
 Ehrlichiosis – Paul Ehrlich
 Eisenmenger's syndrome – Victor Eisenmenger
 Ekbom's Syndrome – Karl-Axel Ekbom
 Emanuel syndrome – Beverly Emanuel
 Emery–Dreifuss muscular dystrophy – Alan Eglin H. Emery, Fritz E. Dreifuss
 Erb–Duchenne palsy (a.k.a. Erb palsy) – Wilhelm Heinrich Erb, Guillaume-Benjamin-Amand Duchenne de Boulogne
 Erdheim–Chester disease – Jakob Erdheim, William Chester
 Evans syndrome – R. S. Evans
 Extramammary Paget's disease – Sir James Paget

F
 Fabry disease – Johannes Fabry
 Fanconi anemia – Guido Fanconi
 Fanconi syndrome – Guido Fanconi
 Farber disease – Sidney Farber
 Felty's syndrome – Augustus Roi Felty
 Fitz-Hugh–Curtis syndrome – Thomas Fitz-Hugh Jr., Arthur Hale Curtis
 Foix–Alajouanine syndrome – Charles Foix, Théophile Alajouanine
 Foix–Chavany–Marie syndrome - Charles Foix, Jean Alfred Émile Chavany, Julien Marie
 Fournier gangrene – Jean Alfred Fournier
 Forbes–Albright syndrome – Anne Pappenheimer Forbes, Fuller Albright
 Forbes disease – Gilbert Burnett Forbes
 Fregoli delusion – Leopoldo Fregoli, an Italian actor
 Frey's syndrome - Lucja Frey-Gottesman, Jewish neurosurgeon 
 Friedreich's ataxia – Nikolaus Friedreich
 Fritsch–Asherman syndrome (a.k.a. Fritsch syndrome) – Heinrich Fritsch, Joseph Asherman
 Fryns syndrome – Jean-Pierre Fryns
 Fuchs' dystrophy – Ernst Fuchs

G
 Ganser syndrome – Sigbert Ganser
 Gaucher's disease – Philippe Gaucher
 Gerbec–Morgagni–Adams–Stokes syndrome (a.k.a. Adams–Stokes syndrome, Gerbezius–Morgagni–Adams–Stokes syndrome, Stokes–Adams syndrome) – Marko Gerbec, Giovanni Battista Morgagni, Robert Adams, William Stokes
 Gerbezius–Morgagni–Adams–Stokes syndrome (a.k.a. Adams–Stokes syndrome, Gerbec–Morgagni–Adams–Stokes syndrome, Stokes–Adams syndrome) – Marko Gerbec (Latinized as Gerbezius), Giovanni Battista Morgagni, Robert Adams, William Stokes
 Ghon's complex – Anton Ghon
 Ghon focus – Anton Ghon
 Gilbert's syndrome – Augustin Nicolas Gilbert
 Gitelman syndrome – Hillel J. Gitelman
 Glanzmann's thrombasthenia – Eduard Glanzmann
 Goodpasture's syndrome – Ernest Goodpasture
 Goldenhar syndrome – Maurice Goldenhar
 Gorlin–Goltz syndrome – Robert J. Gorlin, Robert W. Goltz
 Gouverneur’s syndrome – R. Gouverneur
 Graves' disease – Robert James Graves
 Graves–Basedow disease – Robert James Graves, Karl Adolph von Basedow
 Grawitz tumor – Paul Albert Grawitz
 Grinker myelinopathy – Roy R. Grinker, Sr.
 Gruber syndrome – Georg Gruber
 Guillain–Barré syndrome – Georges Guillain, Jean Alexandre Barré
 Gunther's disease – Hans Gunther

H
 Hailey–Hailey disease – Hugh Edward Hailey, William Howard Hailey
 Hallervorden–Spatz disease – Julius Hallervorden, Hugo Spatz This disorder is now preferred to be called Pantothenate kinase-associated neurodegeneration (PKAN) given that the genetics are now known but mainly due to the unethical research practices of Hallervorden and Spatz as they were Nazis. See List of medical eponyms with Nazi associations
 Hand–Schüller–Christian disease – Alfred Hand, Artur Schüller, Henry Asbury Christian
 Hansen's disease – Gerhard Armauer Hansen
 Hardikar Syndrome – Winita Hardikar
 Hartnup disease (a.k.a. Hartnup disorder) – Hartnup family of London, U.K.
 Hashimoto thyroiditis – Hakaru Hashimoto
 Havisham syndrome (a.k.a. Diogenes syndrome, Miss Havisham syndrome, and Plyushkin syndrome) – Miss Havisham, a fictional character in Charles Dickens' Great Expectations
 Hecht–Scott syndrome – Jacqueline T. Hecht, Charles I. Scott, Jr 
 Henoch–Schönlein purpura – Eduard Heinrich Henoch, Johann Lukas Schönlein
 Heyde's syndrome – Edward C. Heyde
 Hirschsprung disease – Harald Hirschsprung
 Hodgkin disease – Thomas Hodgkin
 Holt–Oram syndrome – Mary Clayton Holt, Samuel Oram
 Horner syndrome – Johann Friedrich Horner
 Horton headache – Bayard Taylor Horton
 Huntington's disease – George Huntington
 Hurler syndrome – Gertrud Hurler
 Hurler–Scheie syndrome – Gertrud Hurler, Harold Glendon Scheie
 Hutchinson–Gilford progeria syndrome – Jonathan Hutchinson, Hastings Gilford

I
 Illig syndrome – Ruth Illig
 Irvine–Gass syndrome – S. Rodman Irvine, J. Donald M. Gass

J
 Jaeken's disease – Jaak Jaeken
 Jakob–Creutzfeldt disease – Alfons Maria Jakob, Hans Gerhard Creutzfeldt
 Jalili syndrome – I.K. Jalili
 Jarvi–Nasu–Hakola disease – O. Jarvi, T. Nasu, P. Hakola
 Johanson–Blizzard syndrome – Ann Johanson, Robert M. Blizzard
 Jones-Smith Syndrome – Kenneth Lyons Jones, David Weyhe Smith

K
 Kahler's disease – Otto Kahler
 Kallmann syndrome – Franz Josef Kallmann
 Kanner syndrome – Leo Kanner 
 Kaposi sarcoma – Moritz Kaposi
 Kartagener syndrome – Manes Kartagener
 Kasabach–Merritt syndrome – Haig Haigouni Kasabach, Katharine Krom Merritt
 Kashin–Beck disease – Nicolai Ivanowich Kashin, Evgeny Vladimirovich Bek
 Kawasaki disease – Tomisaku Kawasaki
 Kearns–Sayre syndrome – Thomas P. Kearns, George Pomeroy Sayre
 Kennedy's disease – William R. Kennedy
 Kennedy's syndrome – Robert Foster Kennedy
 Kenny-Caffey syndrome – Frederic Marshal Kenny, John Patrick Caffey
 Kienbock's disease – Robert Kienböck
 Kikuchi's disease – Masahiro Kikuchi, Y.Fujimoto
 Kimmelstiel–Wilson disease – Paul Kimmelstiel, Clifford Wilson
 Kimura's disease – T. Kimura
 King–Kopetzky syndrome – P. F. King, Samuel J. Kopetzky
 Kinsbourne syndrome – Marcel Kinsbourne
 Kjer's optic neuropathy – Poul Kjer
 Klatskin's tumor – Gerald Klatskin
 Klinefelter syndrome – Harry Klinefelter
 Klüver–Bucy syndrome – Heinrich Klüver, Paul Bucy
 Köhler disease – Alban Köhler
 Korsakoff syndrome – Sergei Korsakoff
 Kounis syndrome – Nicholas Kounis
 Krabbe's disease – Knud Haraldsen Krabbe
 Krukenberg tumor – Friedrich Ernst Krukenberg
 Kugelberg–Welander disease – Erik Klas Henrik Kugelberg, Lisa Welander
 Kuttner's tumor – Hermann Küttner

L
 Lafora's disease – Gonzalo Rodriguez Lafora
 Laron syndrome – Zvi Laron
 Laurence–Moon syndrome – John Zachariah Laurence, Robert Charles Moon
 Laurence–Moon–Bardet–Biedl syndrome (a.k.a. Laurence–Moon–Biedl–Bardet syndrome, a.k.a. Laurence–Moon–Biedl syndrome - both now deemed invalid constructs, see instead Bardet–Biedl syndrome) – John Zachariah Laurence, Robert Charles Moon, Georges Bardet, Arthur Biedl
 Legg–Calvé–Perthes syndrome – Arthur Legg, Jacques Calvé, Georg Perthes
 Leigh's disease – Denis Archibald Leigh
 Leiner syndrome – Karl Leiner, André Moussous
 Leishmaniasis – Sir William Boog Leishman
 Lejeune’s syndrome – Jérôme Lejeune
 Lemierre's syndrome – André Lemierre
 Lenègre's disease – Jean Lenègre
 Lennox–Gastaut syndrome (a.k.a. Lennox syndrome) – William Gordon Lennox, Henri Jean Pascal Gastaut
 Lesch–Nyhan syndrome – Michael Lesch, William Leo Nyhan
 Letterer–Siwe disease – Erich Letterer, Sture Siwe
 Lev disease – Maurice Lev
 Lewandowsky–Lutz dysplasia – Felix Lewandowsky, Wilhelm Lutz
 Li–Fraumeni syndrome – Frederick Pei Li, Joseph F. Fraumeni, Jr.
 Libman–Sacks disease – Emanuel Libman, Benjamin Sacks
 Liddle's syndrome – Grant Liddle
 Lisfranc injury (a.k.a. Lisfranc dislocation, a.k.a. Lisfranc fracture) – Jacques Lisfranc de St. Martin
 Listeriosis – Joseph Lister
 Lobomycosis – Jorge Lobo
 Loeys-Dietz Syndrome - Bart Loeys, Hal Dietz
 Löffler's eosinophilic endocarditis – Wilhelm Löffler
 Löfgren syndrome – Sven Halvar Löfgren
 Lou Gehrig's disease – Lou Gehrig
 Lowe Syndrome – Charles Upton Lowe
 Ludwig's angina – Wilhelm Friedrich von Ludwig
 Lujan-Fryns syndrome - J. Enrique Lujan, Jean-Pierre Fryns
 Lynch syndrome – Henry T. Lynch

M
 Machado–Joseph Azorean disease (a.k.a. Machado–Joseph disease, Machado disease, Joseph disease) – named for William Machado and Antone Joseph, patriarchs of families in which it was first identified
 Marie–Foix–Alajouanine syndrome – Pierre Marie, Charles Foix, Théophile Alajouanine
 Maladie de Charcot – Jean-Martin Charcot
 Mallory–Weiss syndrome – G. Kenneth Mallory, Soma Weiss
 Mansonelliasis – Sir Patrick Manson
 Marburg multiple sclerosis – Otto Marburg
 Marfan syndrome – Antoine Marfan
 Marshall syndrome – Richard E. Marshall
 Marshall–Smith–Weaver syndrome (a.k.a. Marshall–Smith syndrome, Greig syndrome) – Richard E. Marshall, David Weyhe Smith
 Martin–Albright syndrome (a.k.a. Albright IV syndrome) – August E. Martin, Fuller Albright
 May–Hegglin anomaly – Richard May, Robert Hegglin
 Maydl's hernia—Karel Maydl
 Mayer–Rokitansky–Küster–Hauser syndrome (MRKH) - August Franz Josef Karl Mayer, Carl von Rokitansky, Hermann Küster, Georges Andre Hauser
 Mazzotti reaction – Luigi Mazzotti
 McArdle's Disease – Brian McArdle
 McCune–Albright syndrome – (a.k.a. Albright disease, Albright hereditary osteodystrophy, Albright syndrome) – Donovan James McCune, Fuller Albright
 Meckel–Gruber syndrome (a.k.a. Meckel syndrome) – Johann Meckel, Georg Gruber
 Meigs' syndrome – Joe Vincent Meigs
 Ménétrier's disease – Pierre Eugène Ménétrier
 Ménière’s disease – Prosper Ménière
 Menkes disease – John Hans Menkes
 Middleton syndrome – Stephen John Middleton
 Mirizzi syndrome 
 Mikulicz's disease – Jan Mikulicz-Radecki
 Miss Havisham syndrome (a.k.a. Diogenes syndrome, Havisham syndrome, and Plyushkin syndrome) – Miss Havisham, a fictional character in Charles Dickens' Great Expectations 
 Mondor's disease – Henri Mondor
 Monge's disease – Carlos Monge
 Mortimer's disease – First documented by Jonathan Hutchinson, named for his patient Mrs. Mortimer
 Morton's neuroma
 Moschcowitz syndrome – Eli Moschcowitz
 Mowat–Wilson syndrome – David Mowat, Meredith Wilson
 Mucha–Habermann disease – Viktor Mucha, Rudolf Habermann
 Mulvihill–Smith syndrome – John J. Mulvihill, David Weyhe Smith
 Munchausen syndrome – Baron Munchausen
 Munchausen syndrome by proxy – Baron Munchausen
 Myhre–Riley–Smith syndrome – S. Myhre, Harris D. Riley Jr.

N
 Nasu–Hakola disease – T. Nasu, P. Hakola
 Non-Hodgkin lymphoma – Thomas Hodgkin
 Noonan syndrome – Jacqueline Noonan

O
 Ormond's disease – John Kelso Ormond
 Osgood–Schlatter disease – Robert Bayley Osgood, Carl B. Schlatter
 Osler–Weber–Rendu syndrome – William Osler, Frederick Parkes Weber, Henri Jules Louis Marie Rendu
 Othello Syndrome – Delusional or pathological jealousy

P
 Paget's disease of bone (a.k.a. Paget's disease) – James Paget
 Paget's disease of the breast (a.k.a. Paget's disease of the nipple) – James Paget
 Paget's disease of the penis – James Paget
 Paget's disease of the vulva – James Paget
 Paget–Schroetter disease (a.k.a. Paget–Schroetter syndrome and Paget–von Schrötter disease) – James Paget, Leopold von Schrötter
 Parkinson's disease – James Parkinson 
 Patau syndrome – Klaus Patau
 Pearson syndrome – Howard Pearson
 Pelizaeus–Merzbacher disease – Friedrich Christoph Pelizaeus, Ludwig Merzbacher
 Pendred syndrome - Vaughan Pendred - a British doctor (1869–1946)
 Perthes syndrome – Arthur Legg, Jacques Calvé, Georg Perthes
 Peutz–Jeghers syndrome – Jan Peutz, Harold Jeghers
 Peyronie's disease – François Gigot de la Peyronie
 Pfaundler–Hurler syndrome – Meinhard von Pfaundler, Gertrud Hurler 
 Pick's disease – Arnold Pick
 Pickardt syndrome – Renate Pickardt
 Plummer's disease – Henry Stanley Plummer
 Plummer–Vinson syndrome (a.k.a. Kelly–Patterson syndrome, Paterson–Brown–Kelly syndrome, and Waldenstrom–Kjellberg syndrome) – Henry Stanley Plummer and Porter Paisley Vinson
 Plyushkin syndrome (a.k.a. Diogenes syndrome, Havisham syndrome, and Miss Havisham syndrome)– Stepan Plyushkin, a fictional character in Nikolai Gogol's Dead Souls
 Poland's syndrome – Alfred Poland
 Pompe's disease – Johann Cassianius Pompe
 Pott's disease – Percivall Pott
 Pott's puffy tumor – Percivall Pott
 Potocki–Lupski syndrome – Lorraine Potocki, James R. Lupski
 Potocki–Shaffer syndrome – Lorraine Potocki, Lisa G. Shaffer
 Potter sequence – Edith Potter
 Prader–Willi syndrome – Andrea Prader, Heinrich Willi
 Prasad's Syndrome – Ashok Prasad
 Primrose syndrome – D. A. Primrose
 Prinzmetal angina – Myron Prinzmetal
 Purtilo syndrome (a.k.a. Duncan disease and Duncan syndrome) –

Q
 Quarelli syndrome – G.Quarelli
 Quervain syndrome

R
 Ramsay Hunt syndromes – James Ramsay Hunt
 Ranke complex – Karl Ernst Ranke
 Raymond Céstan syndrome – Étienne Jacques Marie Raymond Céstan
 Raynaud disease – Maurice Raynaud
 Refsum disease – Sigvald Bernhard Refsum
 Reiter syndrome – Hans Conrad Julius Reiter (This is now a strongly discouraged eponym due to Dr. Reiter's Nazi party ties. The disease is now known as reactive arthritis.)
 Rett syndrome – Andreas Rett
 Reye syndrome – Douglas Reye
 Rickettsiosis – Howard Taylor Ricketts
 Riddoch syndrome – George Riddoch
 Riedel thyroiditis – Bernhard Riedel
 Riggs disease – John M. Riggs (dentist)
 Riley–Day syndrome – Conrad Milton Riley, Richard Lawrence Day
 Riley–Smith syndrome – Harris D. Riley Jr., William R. Smith
 Ritter disease – Baron Gottfried Ritter von Rittershain
 Robles disease – Rodolfo Robles
 Roger disease – Henri Louis Roger
 Rolandic epilepsy – Luigi Rolando
 Rotor syndrome – Arturo Belleza Rotor
 Rubinstein–Taybi syndrome – Jack Herbert Rubinstein, Hooshang Taybi
 Russell–Silver syndrome – Alexander Russell, Henry Silver
 Ruvalcaba–Myhre syndrome – Rogelio H. A. Ruvalcaba, S. Myhre
 Ruvalcaba–Myhre–Smith syndrome – Rogelio H. A. Ruvalcaba, S. Myhre, David Weyhe Smith
 Ruzicka–Goerz–Anton syndrome – T. Ruzicka, G. Goerz, I. Anton-Lamprecht

S
 Saint's triad – C. F. M. Saint
 Sandhoff disease – Konrad Sandhoff
 Sandifer syndrome – Paul Sandifer
 Sanjad-Sakati syndrome (a.k.a Sanjad-Sakati-Richardson-Kirk syndrome, Hypoparathyroidism-retardation-dysmophic (HRD)) - Sami A. Sanjad,Nadia Awni Sakati, Ricky J Richardson, Jeremy MW Kirk 
 Schamberg disease – Jay Frank Schamberg
 Scheie syndrome – Harold Glendon Scheie
 Scheuermann's disease – Holger Scheuermann
 Schilder's disease – Paul Ferdinand Schilder
 Schinzel–Giedion syndrome – Albert Schinzel, Andreas Giedion
 Schnitzler syndrome – Liliane Schnitzler
 Seaver Cassidy syndrome – Laurie Seaver, Suzanne Cassidy
 Seligmann's disease – Maxime Seligmann
 Sever's disease – J. W. Sever
 Shabbir syndrome – G. Shabbir
 Sheehan's syndrome – Harold Leeming Sheehan
 Shprintzen's syndrome – Robert Shprintzen
 Shwachman–Bodian–Diamond syndrome – Harry Shwachman, Martin Bodian, Louis Klein Diamond
 Silver–Russell syndrome (a.k.a. Silver–Russell dwarfism) – Henry Silver, Alexander Russell
 Simmonds' syndrome – Moritz Simmonds
 Sipple's syndrome – John H. Sipple
 Sjögren syndrome – Henrik Sjögren
 Sjögren–Larsson syndrome – Torsten Sjögren, Tage Konrad Leopold Larsson
 Skumin syndrome - Victor Skumin
 Smith–Lemli–Opitz syndrome – David Weyhe Smith
 Stargardt disease – Karl Stargardt
 Steele–Richardson–Olszewski syndrome – 
 Stevens–Johnson syndrome – Albert Mason Stevens, Frank Chambliss Johnson
 Sturge–Weber syndrome – William Allen Sturge, Frederick Parkes Weber
 Still's disease – Sir George Frederic Still
 Susac's syndrome – John Susac
 Sutton's disease – Richard Lightburn Sutton

T
 TAN syndrome – Tan Aik Kah
 Takayasu's arteritis – Mikito Takayasu
 Tatton-Brown-Rahman syndrome - Kate Tatton Brown, Nazneen Rahman
 Tay–Sachs disease – Warren Tay, Bernard Sachs
 Theileriosis – Sir Arnold Theiler
 Thomsen's disease – Julius Thomsen
 Tietz syndrome – Walter Tietz
 Tietze syndrome – Alexander Tietze
 Temple–Baraitser syndrome - Karin Temple and Michael Baraitser
 Todd syndrome (a.k.a. Alice in Wonderland syndrome) - John Todd
 Tourette syndrome – Georges Albert Édouard Brutus Gilles de la Tourette
 Treacher Collins syndrome – Edward Treacher Collins
 Turcot syndrome – Jacques Turcot
 Turner syndrome – Henry Turner

U
 Unverricht–Lundborg disease – Heinrich Unverricht, Herman Bernhard Lundborg
 Usher syndrome – Charles Usher

V
 Valentino syndrome – Rudolph Valentino
 Verner Morrison syndrome – J. V. Verner, A. B. Morrison
 Vincent's angina – Henri Vincent
 Virchow's syndrome – Rudolf Virchow
 Vogt–Koyanagi–Harada disease - Alfred Vogt, Yoshizo Koyanagi, Einosuke Harada
 Von Gierke's disease – Edgar von Gierke
 Von Hippel–Lindau disease – Eugen von Hippel, Arvid Vilhelm Lindau
 Von Recklinghausen's disease – Friedrich Daniel von Recklinghausen
 Von Willebrand's disease – Erik Adolf von Willebrand
 Von Zumbusch (acute) generalized pustular psoriasis) – (a.k.a. Zumbusch psoriasis) Leo Ritter von Zumbusch
 Von Zumbusch syndrome (a.k.a. Csillag disease, Hallopeau disease, Zumbusch syndrome) – Leo Ritter von Zumbusch

W
 Waardenburg syndrome – Petrus Johannes Waardenburg
 Waldenstrom–Kjellberg syndrome – Jan G. Waldenström, S. R. Kjellberg
 Waldenstrom macroglobulinaemia – Jan G. Waldenström
 Warkany syndrome 1 – Joseph Warkany
 Warkany syndrome 2 – Joseph Warkany
 Warthin's tumor – Aldred Scott Warthin
 Waterhouse–Friderichsen syndrome – Rupert Waterhouse, Carl Friderichsen
 Watson syndrome – G.H.Watson
 Weber–Christian disease – Frederick Parkes Weber, Henry Asbury Christian
 Wegener's granulomatosis – Friedrich Wegener (This usage is now formally discouraged by professional medical societies due to the Nazi associations of the eponymous physician. The disease is now known as granulomatosis with polyangiitis.)
 Weil's disease – Adolf Weil
 Welander distal myopathy – Lisa Welander
 Wells syndrome – George Crichton Wells
 Werdnig–Hoffmann disease – Guido Werdnig, Johann Hoffmann
 Wermer's syndrome – Paul Wermer
 Werner's syndrome – Otto Werner
 Wernicke's encephalopathy – Karl Wernicke
 Westerhof syndrome – Wiete Westerhof
 Westerhof–Beemer–Cormane syndrome – Wiete Westerhof, Frederikus Antonius Beemer, R. H.Cormane
 Whipple's disease – George Hoyt Whipple
 Williams syndrome – J. C. P. Williams
 Wilms tumor – Max Wilms
 Wilson's disease – Samuel Alexander Kinnier Wilson
 Willis–Ekbom syndrome – Thomas Willis, Karl-Axel Ekbom
 Wiskott–Aldrich syndrome – Alfred Wiskott, Robert Aldrich
 Wittmaack–Ekbom syndrome – Theodur Wittmaack, Karl-Axel Ekbom
 Wohlfart–Kugelberg–Welander disease – Karl Gunnar Vilhelm Wohlfart, Erik Klas Henrik Kugelberg, Lisa Welander
 Wolff–Parkinson–White syndrome – Louis Wolff, John Parkinson, Paul Dudley White
 Wolman disease – Moshe Wolman
 Wernicke encephalopathy - Carl Wernicke
 Wernicke–Korsakoff syndrome - (Named for the combination of Wernicke encephalopathy and Korsakoff syndrome which were discovered separately, unlike usual naming this disease was not discovered by Carl Wernicke and Sergei Korsakoff)

X

Y
 Yesudian syndrome – Paul Yesudian

Z
 Zahorsky syndrome I – John Zahorsky 
 Zahorsky syndrome II (a.k.a. Mikulicz' Aphthae, Mikulicz' Disease, Sutton disease 2, Mikulicz' Aphthae, Zahorsky disease) – John Zahorsky 
 Zellweger syndrome – Hans Ulrich Zellweger
 Zenker diverticulum – Friedrich Albert von Zenker
 Zenker paralysis – Friedrich Albert von Zenker
 Zieve syndrome – Leslie Zieve
 Zimmermann–Laband syndrome (a.k.a. Laband syndrome, Laband–Zimmermann syndrome) – Karl Wilhelm Zimmermann
 Zollinger–Ellison syndrome – Robert Zollinger, Edwin Ellison
 Zondek–Bromberg–Rozin syndrome (a.k.a. Zondek syndrome) – Bernhard Zondek, Yehuda M. Bromberg, R.Rozin
 Zuelzer syndrome – Wolf William Zuelzer
 Zuelzer–Kaplan syndrome II (a.k.a. Crosby syndrome) – Wolf William Zuelzer, E. Kaplan
 Zuelzer–Ogden syndrome – Wolf William Zuelzer, Frank Nevin Ogden
 Zumbusch psoriasis (a.k.a. von Zumbusch (acute) generalized pustular psoriasis) – Leo Ritter von Zumbusch
 Zumbusch syndrome (a.k.a. Csillag disease, Hallopeau disease, von Zumbusch syndrome) – Leo Ritter von Zumbusch

See also
 List of eponymous medical signs, a list of medical signs named after people

References

External links
 Whonamedit?, a site dedicated to medical eponyms and their namesakes.

Diseases
Eponymous diseases